FinP encodes an antisense non-coding RNA gene that is complementary to part of the TraJ 5' UTR. The FinOP system regulates the transfer of F-like plasmids. The traJ gene encodes a protein required for transcription from the major transfer promoter, pY. The FinO protein is essential for effective repression, acting by binding to FinP and protecting it from RNase E degradation.

References

External links 
 
 

Antisense RNA